William Wyndham may refer to:

Sir William Wyndham, 1st Baronet (c. 1632–1683), of Orchard Wyndham, English politician, Member of Parliament for Somerset, 1656–1658 and for Taunton 1660–1679
Sir William Wyndham, 3rd Baronet (1687–1740), of Orchard Wyndham, English politician, Chancellor of the Exchequer, 1713–1714, Member of Parliament for Somerset, 1710–1740
The Hon. William Frederick Wyndham (1763–1828), English diplomat
William Wyndham (1796–1862), English MP for Wiltshire South, 1852–1859

See also
Wyndham baronets
Earl of Egremont
William Windham (disambiguation)